

Events
March 14 – After the acquittal/mistrial (on the previous evening) of Charles Matranga and 8 of his associates for conspiracy in the murder of New Orleans Police Chief David C. Hennessy, a lynch mob enters the jail and murders 11 of the 19 suspects in the murder. Matranga himself survives by hiding within the prison. For the first time the possibility of an Italian secret criminal organization operating in New Orleans is discussed in the United States. A New Orleans grand jury investigating the incident would later report: 
"..our research has developed the existence of the secret organization styled 'Mafia'.... Officers of the Mafia and many of its members were not known. Among them are men born in this city of Italian origin.... The larger number of the society is composed of Italians and Sicilians."

Arts and literature

Births
Joe Aiello (Giuseppe Aiello), Chicago and New York mobster and president of the Unione Siciliane.
Ruggiero Boiardo (Richie Boiardo), Genovese crime family caporegime (New Jersey) and Abner Zwillman associate.
Jack Dragna, Los Angeles Mafia Don. 
Owney "The Killer" Madden, New York Prohibition gangster 
Stefano Magaddino, "The Undertaker" Buffalo Mafia Don. 
January 26 – Frank Costello (Francesco Castiglia) "The Prime Minister", National Crime Syndicate and later Cosa Nostra member.

Deaths
Eleven people were lynched on March 14, 1891, for their alleged role in the murder of David Hennessy, which was widely believed at the time to be a Mafia assassination. This claim has since been disputed by some historians. Several of the lynch victims had been tried and acquitted, and some had not been tried. See March 14, 1891 lynchings.

References

Years in organized crime
Organized crime